Kumble R. Subbaswamy is the 11th and current chancellor of the University of Massachusetts Amherst. He has been appointed as Interim Senior Vice President for Academic and Student Affairs and Equity, serving the five-campus University of Massachusetts system. He formerly served as the provost of University of Kentucky.

He is a member of the American Academy of Arts and Sciences and also an elected fellow of the American Physical Society, and has research interests in computational chemistry and condensed matter physics.

On June 2, Subbaswamy announced that he would retire from being the chancellor by the end of June 2023.

Early life and education
Subbaswamy was born in the city of Bangalore, Karnataka in India. He earned a Bachelor of Science degree in physics from Bangalore University, a Master of Science in Physics from University of Delhi, and a Doctor of Philosophy in Physics from Indiana University Bloomington.

Career

Academia
He served as Research associate in the Department of Physics at University of California, Irvine from 1976 to 1978. He later joined as Assistant Professor at University of Kentucky in 1978 and rose to become the Chair of the Department of Physics and Astronomy from 1993 to 1997.

He also served as Adjunct professor (Professore a contratto) at University of Pavia in Italy in 1990.

He later served as the Dean of the College of Arts and Sciences in the  Department of Physics at both University of Miami and Indiana University Bloomington. He then served as the provost of University of Kentucky.

After becoming chancellor of the University of Massachusetts Amherst in 2012, he and his wife worked with the UMass Permaculture Committee to create a sustainable garden featuring Southeast Asian plants at their Hillside residence on campus.

Honors and awards
He was awarded an honorary Doctor of Humane Letters from Indiana University Bloomington during 2019 Winter Commencement. He was also awarded Chancellor and Provost Medallion in 2006 and also IU Foundation President's Medallion from Indiana University Bloomington.

Books, Research Papers and Journals
Kumble Subbaswamy is a published author and coauthor of several books, research papers and journals.
 Local Density Theory of Polarizability (Physics of Solids and Liquids) (Publisher: Springer, Publication Year: 1st ed. 1990 edition (31 December 2013)).

References

External links
 
 
 Official website - University of Massachusetts Amherst
 Biography - University of Massachusetts Amherst

Living people
21st-century American physicists
American physicists
Kannada people
Scientists from Bangalore
20th-century Indian physicists
Indiana University faculty
University of Miami faculty
University of Kentucky faculty
University of California, Irvine faculty
Academic staff of the University of Pavia
Leaders of the University of Massachusetts Amherst
Indian emigrants to the United States
Indiana University Bloomington alumni
Bangalore University alumni
Delhi University alumni
American academics of Indian descent
American Hindus
Year of birth missing (living people)
Fellows of the American Physical Society
Indian expatriates in the United States
Naturalized citizens of the United States